Vegas TV may refer to:
 KTUD-CD, a defunct independent television station
 Vegas (1978 TV series), a crime drama television series on ABC
 Vegas (2012 TV series), a period drama television series on CBS
 Las Vegas (TV series), a comedy-drama television series on NBC